Balistes is a genus of triggerfish.

Species
There are currently four recognized species in this genus:
 Balistes capriscus J. F. Gmelin, 1789 (grey triggerfish)
 Balistes polylepis Steindachner, 1876 (finescale triggerfish)
 Balistes punctatus J. F. Gmelin, 1789 (bluespotted triggerfish)
 Balistes vetula Linnaeus, 1758 (queen triggerfish)

Fossil species
 † Balistes dubius Blainville, 1818 (Middle Miocene)
 † Balistes vegai Lopez, Carr & Lorenzo, 2019 (Miocene)

References

External links
 
 

Balistidae
Marine fish genera
Taxa named by Carl Linnaeus